The First Leiter building (or Leiter I) was a Chicago commercial structure built in 1879 by William Le Baron Jenney. It was renovated and extended in 1888, and demolished in 1972. 

Jenney designed this building, located at Washington and Wells Streets, as a department store for Levi Z. Leiter.  This building marked a significant milestone in architectural engineering: it combined, for the first time, four essential elements of a modern skyscraper in one building. These were: its great height (Leiter I was originally five stories tall, and shortly after expanded to seven stories); an iron skeletal frame; terra cotta fireproofing materials on all of its structural members; and, vertical transportation via elevators. It also utilized a new type of glass in its windows.  Although the city building department required Jenney to build one exterior party wall as a traditional masonry loadbearing structure and the floors were of heavy timber construction, the rest of the building was a truly modern innovation.

See also
 Chicago architecture
 Second Leiter Building

References

External links

Commercial buildings completed in 1879
Former buildings and structures in Chicago
Demolished buildings and structures in Chicago
Historic American Buildings Survey in Chicago